Cymophora is a genus of flowering plants in the family Asteraceae. All known species are native to Mexico.

Some authors have included these plants in the genus Tridax because they are morphologically similar with the same chromosome count. Others find that they have sufficient morphological differences to be kept separate.

 Species
 Cymophora accedens  - Guerrero, Oaxaca, Michoacán, Jalisco
 Cymophora hintonii - Michoacán, Jalisco, Colima
 Cymophora luckowana - Guerrero
 Cymophora pringlei - Guerrero

References

Millerieae
Asteraceae genera
Endemic flora of Mexico